The Parry Sound forest fire (officially designated as Parry Sound 33) was a wildfire in unorganized parts of Parry Sound District, Ontario, Canada.

Progression 
The fire was first discovered on July 18, 2018. The Ministry of Natural Resources and Forestry (MNRF), the Ontario government ministry responsible for battling forest fires, began immediate efforts to contain the blaze. By July 23, 2018, the fire had covered , forcing evacuations and a state of emergency in the community of Henvey Inlet First Nation, as well as evacuations of people in French River Provincial Park.

By July 28, 2018, the fire was within  of Highway 69. On October 31, 2018, the wildfire was declared extinguished by the Ministry of Natural Resources and Forestry.

Investigation 
An investigation by the MNRF ruled that the fire was started by a disabled ATV near Henvey Inlet. This confirmed unofficial reports that construction crews working on the Henvey Inlet Wind Project were unable to contain a fire started by one of their vehicles. The ministry has decided not to raise charges against the construction company.

See also
List of fires in Canada

References

External links

2018 in Ontario
2018 wildfires in North America
Natural disasters in Ontario
Wildfires in Canada
2018 disasters in Canada
July 2018 events in Canada